The Budaun district of Uttar Pradesh state of India is administratively divided into six tehsils named: Bilsi, Bisauli, Budaun, Dataganj, Gunnaur and Sahaswan, and for implementation of development scheme the district is divided into 18 Blocks.

Block wise villages in Budaun district.

Villages in Asafpur block
Asafpur block Code is 173. The villages include:-

Ahrauli
Ajitpur
Allahpur Khurd
Ambiapur
Asafpur Phakawali
Ashokpur
Banjaria Khanpur
Bargavan 
Banjaria Khanpur 
Basaumi
Bharatpur
Bhur Bisauli
Bidha Nagala
Dabthara
Dabtora
Dabtori    
Daraila    
Daulatpur    
Davri    
Dhanyavali pirdhan list   
Dhoondpur    
Dhoranpur    
Gangoli    
Gulariya    
Guriyari    
Habibpur    
Hardaspur    
Jaitpur    
Jalalpur    
Karengi    
Karlawala    
Kheradas    
Kuarera    
Kuwwan Danda    
Laxmipur    
Mahori    
Malkhanpur    
Mannu Nagar    
Mohkampur   
Mugrra    
Musia Nagala    
Navabpura    
Nehdoli    
Nizampur Shah    
Noornagar Kauria    
Orchhi    
Parmanandpur    
Parsia    
Parvejnagar   
Pindara    
Pipariya    
Pisanhari    
Prithvipur    
Puruwa Khera    
Rajtikoli    
Ratanpur    
Sahawar Shah    
Saindola    
Sangrampur    
Sikri    
Sirsawan    
Sisraka    
Sureni Papri

Villages in Ambiapur block
Ambiapur block code is 178. The villages include:-

Akauli
Ambiapur
Angaul
Badrauni
Badshahpur
Bagarpur Sagarpur
Bain
Bairmai Khurd
Bamed
Banbehta
Bansbaraulia
Baramai Buzurg
Barnidhakpur
Barnighat
Basawanpur
Behtagusain
Behtajabi
Bhatri Govardhanpur
Bhikampur Hardopatti
Bichaula
Chholayan
Dabihari
Dhadoomar
Dhanauli
Din Nagar Sheikhpur
Dudhani
Faqirabad
Fateh Nagla
Fatehullaha Ganj
Garhauli
Garhi
Gatarpur
Gudhni
Haidalpur
Haivatpur
Hardaspur
Harganpur
Hasupur Baheriya
Jahanabad
Jarawan
Jarsaini
Jinaura
Karanpur
Katinna 
Khairati Nagar
Khairi
Khausara
Kherha
Khulet
Kurdarni
Mirzapur Shohra
Mohammadganj
Mooseypur
Mustafabad Tappa Ahamadnagar
Nagarjhoona
Nagla Dallu
Nagla Tarau
Naipindari
Nizampur
Oya
Paharpur
Palpur
Pindaul
Pusgawan
Raipur Buzurg
Rampur Mazra
Rampur Tanda
Risauli
Rudeina Ghangholi
Rujhan
Sabdalpur
Sadarpur
Sahaspur
Sateti Patti Choora
Sateti Patti Inchha
Sateti Patti Sukhat
Satetipatti Gaja
Serasaulpatti Kunwarsahai
Shahbazpur
Shahzadnagar
Siddhpur Chitrasen
Simribhojpur
Sirasaul Patti Seetaram
Sirasaulpatti Jasa
Sirtaul
Sundar Nagar
Surajpur
Tigora Isapur
Ulikhya

Villages in Bisauli block
Bisauli block code is 177
. The villages include:-

Aadpur
Aipura
Ajanavar
Alauaa
Angthara
Atarpura
Basai
Behta Pathak
Bhanpur    
Bhatpura    
Bhavipur    
Bhilaulia    
Bisauli    
Chandpura    
Chani    
Chhivukalan         
Dharmpur Biharipur    
Dhilwari    
Etmadpur    
Fatehpur    
Firozpur    
Gadgaon    
Gandhrauli    
Govindpur Shivnagar    
Hatsa    
Husainpur    
Kaloopur    
Karanpur    
Karkheri    
Khajuria    
Kot    
Kudhauli    
Madanjudi    
Maithra    
Manakpur    
Maujampur    
Mithamai    
Mohammadpur Mai    
Mundia Satasi    
Nagpur    
Nasrol    
Nibhera Sarvarpur    
Paiga Bhikampur    
Panaudi    
Papgaon    
Parauli    
Pipri Raghunathpur    
Pivari    
Raipur Kalan    
Rajpur Katghar    
Ranet Govindpur    
Ratanpur Palia    
Sadruddin Nagar    
Sahanpur    
Sarera    
Sarva    
Sedauli    
Sharah Baraulia    
Shekhupura    
Sichauli    
Siddhpur Kaithauli    
Svaroop Pur    
Tarapur
Damminagar

Villages in Dahgavan block
Dahgavan block code is 179. The villages include:-

Alehadadpur Dhobai
Amanpur
Antar
Badauli Sagarpur
Bairpur Manpur
Bajpur
Bastoi Sikri
Bhawanipur Khalli

Villages in Dataganj  block
Dataganj block code is 185. The villages include:-

Andhrau
Atsena
Azampur
Bakhtpur
Baksena
Basela
Behta Madho
Bhagautipur
Kundra

Villages in Gunnaur block
Gunnaur block code is 171. The villages include:-

Afjalpur
Akbarpur
Asadpur
Aurangabad
Baghau
Baghura Karia Khera
Bahlolpur
Bamanpuri

Villages in Islamnagar block
Islamnagar block code is 174. The villages include:-

Achalpur
Agras
Bajhangi
Balpur
Bhawanipur Nagla
Bhusaya
Buddh Nagar
Byorkasmabad
Kisaira Ibadulla Nagar

Villages in Jagat block
Jagat block code is 181. The villages include:-

Jagat
Aam Ganv    
Ahoramai    
Arifpur Navada    
Bakarpur Kharair
Bhasrala
Budhvayee
Karaulia
Khunak
Kisarua
Kupri
Kutrai
Maujampur
Padauva
Unaula

Villages in Junawai block
Junawai block code is 172. The villages include:-

Ahrola Nawazi
Ajitpur
Babakkarpur
Baghoi
Bairpur Maharaji
Bairpur Sewa
Bandrai
Bijua Nagala

Villages in Mion block
Mion block code is 186. The villages include:-

Abhigaon
Ajitpur
Adharra Kunia
Afzalpur Kalan
Agesi
Bajheda

Villages in Qadar Chowk block
Qadar Chowk block code is 183. The villages include:-

Allapur Chamari
Asrasi
Bamnausi
Barachirra
Baraura
Behta Dambarnagar
Bhakora
Bhamuiya Bhadsia
Gauramai
Ismailpur
Mindholi Mirzapur
Ramzanpur
Lohther

Villages in Rajpura block
Rajpura block code is 170. The villages include:-

Rajpura
Arthal
Bagder    
Bahatkaran    
Baibhur

Villages in Salarpur block
Salarpur block code is 180. Villages include:-

Babat
Badal
Balliya
Bangavan
Barate Gadar
Bhagautipur
Bhajpura
Dahemi
Dhakia
Kunar
Kusaina
Lalei
Shikrapur
Titauli
Yusuf Nagar

Villages in Sahaswan block
Sahaswan block code is 177. The villages include:-

Abbu Nagar
Afzalpur Chhaganpur
Ahmad Nagar Asouli
Anandipur
Athgauna
Aurangabad Tappa Jamni
Baderiya
Bahvalpur

Villages in Samrer block
Samrer block code is 184. The villages include:-

Amroli
Bachhiliya Pukhta
Barahi Sahora
Baura
Bautharia
Bhagawanpur
Brahmpur
Chutmuri

Villages in Ujhani block
Ujhani block code is 182. The villages include:-

Abdulla Ganj
Achaura
Adauli
Ahirvara
Allapur Bhogi
Badaun Chungi Bahar
Baramal Dev
Baramay Khera
Bastara
Bharkuiya
Bitroi
Chandau
Gurai
Jirauliya
Jyorapar Vala
Kurau
Naushera

Villages in Usawan block
Usawan block code is 187. The villages include:-

Asamya Rafatpur
Atena Pukhta
Babai Bhatpura
Bachheli Daranagar
Bachi Jhajhrau
Barainia
Bhakroli
Bhasundhra

Villages in Wazirganj block
Wazirganj block code is 176. Villages include:-

Hatra
Ageyee
Bagrain
Bankota
Baripura
Barour Amanullapur
Bhatani
Byoli
Chinjari
 Nizampur

References

Budaun district